The Microsoft Surface Pro 9 is the company's latest 2-in-1 detachable tablet computer developed to supersede the Surface Pro 8 and Surface Pro X, merging both brands. The device was announced on October 12, 2022 introducing two new colors and alongside the Surface Laptop 5 and Surface Studio 2 Plus. The tablet is powered by the new Windows 11 operating system with the 2022 H2 update, and 12th generation Intel Core processors (Microsoft SQ3/Qualcomm Snapdragon processors for 5G models).

Configurations

Hardware 

 The Surface Pro 9 is the 11th addition to the Surface Pro line and merges the Surface Pro and Surface Pro X brands.
 Powered by Evo 12th Generation Intel Core or Qualcomm Snapdragon processors.
 5G connectivity with nano SIM card slot for Qualcomm Snapdragon models.
 Up to 15.5 hours of battery life with an Intel Processor and up to 19 hours with a Qualcomm processor.
 13-inch touchscreen at 267 PPI, 3:2 aspect ratio, and 120 Hz refresh rate
 2 USB-C ports with Thunderbolt 4
 Up to 1TB of SSD storage. 
 Up to 32GB of memory
 4K video camera support.

Timeline

Notes

References 

Tablet computers introduced in 2022
Microsoft Surface
2-in-1 PCs